Moldova competed at the 2016 Winter Youth Olympics in Lillehammer, Norway from 12 to 21 February 2016.

Cross-country skiing

Boys

Luge

Moldova qualified one boy.

Boys

See also
Moldova at the 2016 Summer Olympics

References

2016 in Moldovan sport
Nations at the 2016 Winter Youth Olympics
Moldova at the Youth Olympics